The 2016 Mid-American Conference women's basketball tournament is a post-season basketball tournament for the Mid-American Conference (MAC) 2015–16 college basketball season. Tournament first-round games will be held on campus sites at the higher seed on March 7. The remaining rounds will be held at Quicken Loans Arena in Cleveland between March 9–12. The winner of the tournament will receive the conference's automatic bid into the 2016 NCAA tournament.

Defending champion Ohio earned the #1 seed. Both of Ohio's conference losses had come against eight-seeded Buffalo. The young Bulls defeated #9 seed Bowling Green and then upset Ohio for a third time that season in the quarter final.  Buffalo then defeated fifth-seeded Akron and regular season runner-up Central Michigan to win the tournament championship. Stephanie Reid of Buffalo was the MVP. With the automatic bid, Buffalo lost to Ohio State in the NCAA Tournament.

Format
Unlike with the recent tournaments, where the top two seeds received byes into the semifinals, with the three and four seeds receiving a bye to the quarterfinals. The tournament will revert to the original structure. The top four seeds will receive just one bye into the quarterfinals.

Seeds

Schedule

Bracket

First round games at campus sites of lower-numbered seeds

See also
2016 MAC men's basketball tournament

References

External links

Mid-American Conference women's basketball tournament
2015–16 Mid-American Conference women's basketball season
2016 in sports in Ohio
Basketball competitions in Cleveland
College basketball tournaments in Ohio
Women's sports in Ohio
2010s in Cleveland